John Fritsch is an American football coach and former player. He served as the head football coach at the University of South Dakota from 1989 to 1991, compiling a record of 10–21. Fritsch played college football at Iowa State University, lettering from 1973 to 1975.

Head coaching record

References

Year of birth missing (living people)
Living people
Iowa State Cyclones football players
South Dakota Coyotes football coaches
High school football coaches in Iowa
High school football coaches in South Dakota